Llanelli Rugby Football Club is a Welsh rugby union club founded on 30 March 1872.

The club's historic home ground was Stradey Park in Llanelli, but they moved in 2008 to the new Parc y Scarlets in adjacent Pemberton. The club song is "Sosban Fach", a Welsh song meaning "Little Saucepan", which is sometimes sung by the club's fans during matches as the club anthem. The team colours are scarlet and white.

Following the 2003 regionalisation of Welsh rugby, Llanelli is now a feeder club to the Scarlets regional team.

Club history

In the beginning 

After attending a Good Friday service in Chapel, a group of young athletes from Llanelli met to discuss the formation of a new rugby club in the area. One of those men was John D Rogers, a young industrialist who had learned to play rugby union football at Rugby School, the game's birthplace. He was assisted by C. Hilton, who became the club's inaugural honorary secretary. On Easter Saturday, 30 March 1872, the group reconvened to confirm the formation of Llanelli RFC. However, due to a lack of opposition and the limitations of transport at that time, no other town club was within a suitable travelling distance until 1875-76.

The club used People’s Park in Llanelli for practice. The playing kit was dark blue, with high-collared jerseys and tight trousers that reached well below the knee, and blue caps.
 
Up until then Llanelli and Neath were the only first-class clubs in Wales (Neath being one year older).

The early years 

Llanelli's first recorded match was against Carmarthen Quins, on 21 December 1875 at People’s Park. Unfortunately, the match had to be abandoned due to bad weather and the result is recorded as a 0–0 draw. The club's second fixture, at the same venue on 1 January 1876, was against Cambrian Club, a team based in Swansea. Two days later they played their first away fixture, against Carmarthen Quins at Picton Court, Carmarthen. This was followed by a match at Felinfoel against Swansea RFC on 5 February 1876. 

Arthur Buchanan had the honour of being the first captain of Llanelli RFC. He died prematurely after accidentally shooting himself. 

In September 1879, it was announced that the club were to move from People’s Park, having acquired the Stradey cricket ground for their practices and matches. The first official match played at the new home was against Neath in the Challenge Cup on 29 November 1879.

A further kit change saw Llanelli RFC play in black before the team colours changed to rose and primrose stripes for the 1882/1883 season. In 1883/84, they changed again to red and chocolate quarters. However, on Easter Monday, 14 April 1884, the Llanelli team took the field in scarlet jerseys, complete with scarlet gold-braided caps. The occasion was the visit of the full Irish team, which had played Wales on the previous Saturday and stopped off on their way home. From that date, the scarlet jersey became permanent and Llanelli RFC became known throughout the rugby world as The Scarlets. Nearly 120 years later, the club's nickname also became the name of the regional team, Scarlets.

The Scarlets 
Llanelli's first major trophies came in 1884 and 1886 with the South Wales Challenge Cup, the forerunner of the modern Welsh Cup. December 1888 saw the team beat a touring New Zealand Natives team by 3–0, with a dropped goal from Harry Bowen. The team claimed their first full international scalp in 1908 when they beat Australia 8–3. This would be the first of many famous victories over touring international sides. Players who wore the Scarlet jersey in this pre-war era included Albert Jenkins, who scored over 121 tries for the club as a centre.

After the war Lewis Jones was one of the stars of the game. He was capped by Wales aged just 18 in 1950, and was instrumental in their Grand Slam win that year. However just two years later, he switched codes from the then amateur rugby union to the professional rugby league and signed for Leeds for a then record amount of £6,000.

Success was, however, not away from Stradey for long. A victory over Australia came in 1967 and the club was about to enter what many would argue was its strongest era. Players at Llanelli during the 1970s included Ray Gravell, Gareth Jenkins, Delme Thomas, Phil Bennett, and Derek Quinnell; and the team was coached by Carwyn James and assisted by former captain and Wales international hooker Norman Gale.

The day the pubs ran dry 

"9 – 3" is a poem by Welsh comedian and singer Max Boyce and refers to the match between Llanelli and the New Zealand All Blacks at Stradey Park in front of 26,000 supporters on 31 October 1972. Llanelli took a 6–0 lead through a converted try but New Zealand struck back to make it 6–3. A long distance Andy Hill penalty ensured Llanelli emerged victors by 9–3 and the crowd famously ran onto the pitch at the end and carried off players such as Delme Thomas. The poem is best known for the line "The day the pubs ran dry", as huge celebrations followed and many pubs in the town sold out of all alcoholic drinks.

Cup success 
The next notable period for Llanelli RFC was during the late 1980s and early 1990s. With players such as Ieuan Evans amongst the squad, Llanelli won the Welsh Cup five times in eight years between 1985 and 1993 including in consecutive seasons in 1991,1992 and 1993. They achieved their most recent success against international opponents when they beat Australia, the world champions at the time, in 1992. Rupert Moon was captain when they won the cup and league which earned Llanelli the title of Best Team in Britain for the 1992–1993 season as well as the nickname "Cup Kings of Wales" due to their success in the Welsh Cup. The late 1990s and early years of the 21st century also produced many Welsh internationals including Rupert Moon, Ricky Evans, Wayne Proctor, Scott Quinnell and Stephen Jones.

The side reached the semi-finals of the Heineken Cup three times: in 2000 against Northampton Saints who went on to win the trophy, in 2002 against Leicester Tigers and in 2007 against Leicester Tigers again. In the first match against Leicester, Llanelli appeared to be going to their first final as they led 12–10 in injury time. But Leicester were awarded a penalty 8 metres inside their own half; Tim Stimpson's kick for goal bounced off both the post and crossbar before just falling over the post to deny Llanelli.

Prior to the regional era, Llanelli RFC were considered the third most successful team in European club rugby, having played the third largest number of games (behind Toulouse and Munster) in the Heineken Cup due to the club's consistency in qualifying for the knockout stages of the tournament. However, they have never won the competition.

The regional era 
Top-level professional rugby changed at Llanelli RFC in 2003 when Llanelli's first team was rebranded, as part of the WRU's move to five professional teams, as Llanelli Scarlets and Llanelli RFC became the club's premiership brand. The Llanelli RFC team now plays in the Welsh Premier Division and Welsh Cup. Under coach Scott Quinnell they won the cup in 2005, their first silverware in their new format.

Match traditions 
As a link to the club's team anthem Sosban Fach, there were sosbenni on top of the uprights of both sets of posts at Stradey Park. The saucepans were installed at Parc y Scarlets.

When Llanelli RFC play Bath, it was tradition that a rag doll was hung from the crossbar, which the winning team then kept until their next encounter. Llanelli RFC last won the doll in 2002. Since 2003 this tradition was continued by the Regional side who successfully 'defended' it when they played Bath in the Powergen Cup semi-final in 2006.

Ground
The Scarlets play at Parc y Scarlets in Pemberton. From 1879 to 2008 they played at Stradey Park in Llanelli. Planning for the new stadium began in 2004.

Club honours 
 Welsh Premier Division: 1992–93, 1998–99, 2001–02, 2010–11
 Welsh Cup: 1973, 1974, 1975, 1976, 1985, 1988, 1991, 1992, 1993, 1998, 2000, 2003, 2005, 2010
 Snelling Sevens: 1960, 1971, 1973, 1979, 1988

Current squad

British and Irish Lions
The following former players were selected for the British and Irish Lions touring squads whilst playing for Llanelli RFC.

Wales International Captains
The following former players captained the Wales national rugby union team while playing for Llanelli RFC.

See also Wales rugby union captains

Other notable former Llanelli players 
Former Llanelli RFC players who have at some time represented Wales or toured with the British Lions.

See also :Category:Llanelli RFC players

Games played against international opposition

Bibliography

References

External links
Llanelli RFC
Llanelli Scarlets
Welsh Rugby Union

 
Rugby clubs established in 1872
Welsh rugby union teams
Sport in Llanelli